Statton is a surname. Notable people with the surname include:

Alison Statton (born 1958), Welsh singer
Christopher Statton (born 1977), American artist and arts administrator, community activist, and philanthropist
Percy Statton (1890–1959), Australian army officer

See also
Staton